Svetlana Shnitko (25 March 1987, Omsk, Russia) is a Russian sports sailor. At the 2012 Summer Olympics, she competed in the Women's Laser Radial class, finishing in 34th place.

References

Living people
Olympic sailors of Russia
Russian female sailors (sport)
Sailors at the 2012 Summer Olympics – Laser Radial
1987 births
Sportspeople from Omsk